Augusta State Airport  is a public use airport located one nautical mile (2 km) west of the central business district of the state capital of Augusta, a city in Kennebec County, Maine, United States. The airport is owned by the state of Maine, but managed and operated by the city of Augusta. It is served by one commercial airline, with scheduled passenger service subsidized by the Essential Air Service program.

As per the Federal Aviation Administration, this airport had 3,554 passenger boardings (enplanements) in calendar year 2008, 3,663 in 2009, and 4,300 in 2010. It is included in the Federal Aviation Administration (FAA) National Plan of Integrated Airport Systems for 2017–2021, in which it is categorized as a non-primary commercial service facility.

Facilities and aircraft 
Augusta State Airport covers an area of 406 acres (164 ha) at an elevation of 352 feet (107 m) above mean sea level. It has two asphalt-paved runways: 17/35 is 5,001 by 150 feet (1,524 x 46 m) and 8/26 is 2,703 by 75 feet (824 x 23 m).

For the 12-month period ending August 11, 2016, the airport had 24,500 aircraft operations, an average of 67 per day: 69% general aviation, 22% air taxi, and 6% military. In April 2018, 37 aircraft were based at this airport: 31 single-engine and 6 multi-engine.
 
The airport was originally developed under a New Deal project by the Maine Emergency Relief Administration, the state division of the Federal Emergency Relief Administration in a statewide survey of airports by Capt. Harry M. Jones in January 1934. The airport was built with 1 N.-S. 2,000x80 gravel runway, 1 E.-W. 1,600x80 gravel runway, and a NE-SW 2,500x80 gravel runway.

Runway 17/35 was reconstructed in the summer of 2012. The original surface was ground up and reclaimed, and runway lights and other navigational aids were upgraded. The project cost $7.5 million and was funded by the federal government. The project required closing the runway for two months, and it was reopened at 3:41 pm on June 29.

The airport received a federal grant of $1 million to purchase new snow removal equipment. The equipment should enable the airport to remain open during snowstorms.

Airline and destination

The following airline offers scheduled passenger service:

Statistics

Top destinations

Other statistics

References

Other sources 

 Essential Air Service documents (Docket DOT-OST-1997-2784) from the U.S. Department of Transportation:
 Order 2004-10-16 (October 25, 2004): reselecting Colgan Air, Inc., to provide subsidized Essential Air Service (EAS) at Presque Isle/Houlton, Augusta/Waterville, Bar Harbor and Rockland, Maine, for a two-year period at a combined annual subsidy rate of $4,312,849.
 Order 2006-8-24 (August 25, 2006): reselecting Colgan Air, Inc., operating as US Airways Express, to provide subsidized essential air service (EAS) at Presque Isle/Houlton, Augusta/Waterville, Bar Harbor, and Rockland, Maine, at a total annual subsidy rate of $4,774,068 ($3,572,592 for Augusta/Waterville, Bar Harbor, and Rockland; $1,201,476 for Presque Isle/Houlton), for the two-year period of November 1, 2006, through October 31, 2008.
 Order 2008-9-7 (September 5, 2008): reselecting Colgan Air, Inc. d/b/a US Airways Express to provide subsidized essential air service (EAS) at Augusta/Waterville and Bar Harbor, Maine, at an annual subsidy of $4,172,501, from November 1, 2008, through October 31, 2010.
 Order 2010-9-28 (September 28, 2010): selecting Hyannis Air Service, Inc., operating as Cape Air, to provide essential air service (EAS) at Augusta/Waterville and Rockland, Maine, for the four-year period from November 1, 2010 to October 31, 2014, for a combined annual subsidy of $2,783,161. Scheduled Service: 28 weekly nonstop round trips between Augusta/Waterville and Boston in peak season (Memorial Day through Columbus Day), and 21 weekly nonstop round trips in off-peak. Aircraft: 9-seat Cessna 402 aircraft.

External links 
 Augusta State Airport, official site
 Aerial image as of April 1997 from USGS The National Map
 

Airports in Kennebec County, Maine
Essential Air Service
State Airport